Mount Cope may refer to:
Mount Cope (Antarctica)
Mount Cope (Victoria) in the Australian Alps